Ben Bubar may refer to:

 Benjamin Bubar Sr. (1878–1967), American United Baptist minister and politician
 Benjamin Bubar Jr. (1917–1995), American politician